"Will no one rid me of this turbulent priest?" (also expressed as "troublesome priest" or "meddlesome priest") is a quote attributed to Henry II of England preceding the death of Thomas Becket, the Archbishop of Canterbury, in 1170. While the quote was not expressed as an order, it prompted four knights to travel from Normandy to Canterbury, where they killed Becket. The phrase is commonly used in modern-day contexts to express that a ruler's wish may be interpreted as a command by his or her subordinates.

Origin
According to historical records, Henry made the outburst on Christmas 1170 at his castle at Bures, Normandy, at the height of the Becket controversy. He had just been informed that Becket had excommunicated a number of bishops supportive of the king, including the Archbishop of York. Edward Grim, who was present at Becket's murder and subsequently wrote the Life of St. Thomas, quotes Henry as saying:

The popular version of the phrase was first used in 1740 by the author and bookseller Robert Dodsley, in his Chronicle of the Kings of England, where he described Henry II's words as follows: "O wretched Man that I am, who shall deliver me from this turbulent Priest?" This was modelled on Romans 7:24: "O wretched man that I am! who shall deliver me from the body of this death?" A similar version of the phrase was later used in George Lyttleton's 1772 History of the Life of King Henry the Second, where the quote is rendered as "[he said] that he was very unfortunate to have maintained so many cowardly and ungrateful men in his court, none of whom would revenge him of the injuries he sustained from one turbulent priest." In The Chronicle of the Kings of England (1821), it becomes "Will none of these lazy insignificant persons, whom I maintain, deliver me from this turbulent priest?", which is then shortened to "who shall deliver me from this turbulent priest?"

No such phrase is spoken in T. S. Eliot's 1932 play Murder in the Cathedral, as Henry does not appear in that play. In Jean Anouilh's 1959 play Becket, Henry says, "Will no one rid me of him? A priest! A priest who jeers at me and does me injury." In the 1964 film Becket, which was based on the Anouilh play, Henry says, "Will no one rid me of this meddlesome priest?"

Consequences
Reportedly, upon hearing the king's words, four knights—Reginald FitzUrse, Hugh de Morville, William de Tracy and Richard le Breton—travelled from Normandy to Canterbury with the intention of forcing Becket to withdraw his excommunication, or, alternatively, taking him back to Normandy by force. The day after their arrival, they confronted Becket in Canterbury Cathedral. When Becket resisted their attempts to seize him, they slashed at him with their swords, killing him. Although nobody, even at the time, believed that Henry directly ordered that Becket be killed, his words had started a chain of events that was likely to have such a result. Moreover, as Henry's harangue had been directed not at Becket, but at his own household, the four probably thought that a failure to act would be regarded as treachery, potentially punishable by death.

Following the murder, Becket was venerated and Henry was vilified. There were demands that the king be excommunicated. Pope Alexander forbade Henry to hear Mass until he had expiated his sin. In May 1172, Henry did public penance in Avranches Cathedral.

The four knights subsequently fled to Scotland and from there to Knaresborough Castle in Yorkshire. All four were excommunicated by Pope Alexander in 1171 during Easter and ordered to undertake penitentiary pilgrimages to the Holy Land for 14 years.

Use and analysis
The Turbulent Priest was the title of Piers Compton's 1957 biography of Becket. 

According to Alfred H. Knight, the phrase "had profound long-term consequences for the development of constitutional law" because its consequences forced the king to accept the benefit of clergy, the principle that secular courts had no jurisdiction over clergy. 

It has been said that the phrase is an example of "direction via indirection", in that it provides the speaker with plausible deniability when a crime is committed as a result of their words.

The New York Times commented that even though Henry might not actually have said the words, "in such matters historical authenticity may not be the point". The phrase has been cited as an example of the shared history with which all British citizens should be familiar, as part of "the collective memory of their country".

In a 2009 BBC documentary on the Satanic Verses controversy, journalist and newsreader Peter Sissons described a February 1989 interview with the Iranian chargé d'affaires in London, Mohammad Mehdi Akhondzadeh Basti. The position of the Iranian government was that the fatwa against Salman Rushdie declared by Iran's Supreme Leader Ayatollah Khomeini was "an opinion". Sissons described this argument as being "a bit like the, 'who will rid me of this turbulent priest', isn't it?"

In a 2017 appearance before the Senate Intelligence Committee, former FBI director James Comey testified that US President Donald Trump had told him that he "hoped" Comey could "let go" of any investigation into Michael Flynn; when asked if he would take "I hope", coming from the president, as a directive, Comey answered, "Yes. It rings in my ears as kind of 'Will no one rid me of this meddlesome priest?

In popular culture
	
"The Archbishop", a 1983 episode of the British television comedy series Blackadder, features two knights overhearing King Richard IV quote the phrase, which they misconstrue as a directive to assassinate the main character.
	
 In the final episode the 1988 television series A Very British Coup these words are spoken by the Director General of MI5 in reference to Harry Perkins, a left wing prime minister and trade unionist.

 In 2011 quoted by innkeeper Samuel Quested in Midsomer Murders ("The Night of the Stag", 2011)

See also 
 Stochastic terrorism

References 

English phrases
Henry II of England
1170 in Europe
Anti-clericalism
Accountability
Euphemisms
Incidents of anti-Catholic violence
History of Seine-Maritime
Thomas Becket